The 1st Arkansas Cavalry Regiment (1862–1865) was a cavalry regiment from the state of Arkansas that served in the Union Army during the American Civil War.

Organization
Arkansas had seceded from the Union in May 1861 and joined the Confederate States of America, raising during the war a total of 48 infantry regiments, more than 30 cavalry regiments and another 25 cavalry battalions, and about 22 artillery batteries for the Confederate Army. Once Union forces had entered the state, however, pro-Union citizens (both black and white) volunteered for the Union Army to serve in 11 infantry regiments, 6 cavalry regiments and 2 artillery batteries.

The 1st Arkansas Cavalry was formed in Springfield, Missouri in July 1862.

Service
It almost immediately moved south to Arkansas to counter the Confederate guerrillas who were harassing Union sympathizers. After the Union victory at the Battle of Pea Ridge, Union forces briefly occupied parts of Northern Arkansas. When they moved their headquarters to Independence County, Arkansas, Union supporters were once again left exposed, causing many to move to Missouri.

The regiment first saw combat in the Battle of Prairie Grove, fought on December 7, 1862. They performed very poorly. A Confederate surge sent two regiments of Missouri Union cavalry fleeing through the 1st Arkansas Cavalry. Seeing hundreds of their comrades fleeing, the Arkansas men joined in the rout. Because of its embarrassing performance, the regiment was assigned to duty in Fayetteville, Arkansas.

Confederate forces under Brigadier General William Lewis Cabell attacked the city on April 18, 1863. Both armies were composed entirely of Arkansas regiments. In three hours of fighting, the Confederates failed to break the Union lines and finally retreated. This victory boosted the 1st Arkansas's morale. For the remainder of the war they would serve on duty against guerrillas or as escort for wagon supply trains.

The First Arkansas Union Cavalry played a unique role in Civil War history. The troops, especially the enlisted men, were not Yankees but Southern Unionists. They were primarily from Northwest Arkansas, and were assigned to occupy their home town and county for two and a half years. It was a very bitter war among neighbors fighting each other as Confederate guerrillas and as Union cavalrymen. After the war the First Arkansas commander, Colonel Marcus LaRue Harrison, stayed on in Fayetteville and became its post-war mayor for a time.

Mustered out of service
The regiment was mustered out of the army in August 1865. During their service, their casualties had been comparatively light. Out of its 1,765 men, 110 had been killed, and another 235 died from disease or accidents.

See also

 List of Arkansas Civil War Union units
 List of United States Colored Troops Civil War Units
 Arkansas in the American Civil War

Notes

Sources

Bibliography 
 Dyer, Frederick H. (1959). A Compendium of the War of the Rebellion. New York and London. Thomas Yoseloff, Publisher. .
 Bishop, Albert W. (1867). Report of the Adjutant General of Arkansas, for the Period of the Late Rebellion, and to November 1, 1866., (Washington : Govt. print. off., 1867).

External links
 The Civil War Archive
 Encyclopedia of Arkansas History
 Edward G. Gerdes Civil War Home Page
 The War of the Rebellion: a Compilation of the Official Records of the Union and Confederate Armies
 The Arkansas History Commission, State Archives, Civil War in Arkansas

Units and formations of the Union Army from Arkansas
1865 disestablishments in Arkansas
Military units and formations established in 1862
1862 establishments in Arkansas
Military units and formations disestablished in 1865